Play for Today is a British television anthology drama series, produced by the BBC and transmitted on BBC1 from 1970 to 1984. During the run, more than three hundred programmes, featuring original television plays, and adaptations of stage plays and novels, were transmitted. The individual episodes were (with a few exceptions noted below) between fifty and a hundred minutes in duration. A handful of these plays, including Rumpole of the Bailey, subsequently became television series in their own right.

History
The strand was a successor to The Wednesday Play, the 1960s anthology series, the title being changed when the day of transmission moved to Thursday to make way for a sport programme. Some works, screened in anthology series' on BBC2, like Willy Russell's Our Day Out (1977), were repeated on BBC1 in the series. The producers of The Wednesday Play, Graeme MacDonald and Irene Shubik, transferred to the new series. Shubik continued with the series until 1973 while MacDonald remained with the series until 1977 when he was promoted. Later producers included Kenith Trodd (1973–1982), David Rose (1972–1980), Innes Lloyd (1975–1982), Margaret Matheson (1977–1979), Sir Richard Eyre (1978–1980), and Pharic MacLaren (1974–1982).

Plays covered all genres. In its time, Play for Today featured contemporary social realist dramas, historical pieces, fantasies, biopics and occasionally science-fiction (The Flipside of Dominick Hide, 1980). Most pieces were written directly for television, but there were also occasional adaptations from other narrative forms, such as novels and stage plays.

Writers who contributed plays to the series included Ian McEwan, John Osborne, Dennis Potter, Stephen Poliakoff, Sir David Hare, Willy Russell, Alan Bleasdale, Arthur Hopcraft, Alan Plater, Graham Reid, David Storey, Andrew Davies, Rhys Adrian and John Hopkins.

Several prominent directors also featured, including Stephen Frears, Alan Clarke, Michael Apted, Mike Newell, Roland Joffé, Ken Loach, Lindsay Anderson, and Mike Leigh. Some of the best remembered plays broadcast in the strand include Edna, the Inebriate Woman (1971), The Foxtrot (1971), Home (1972), Bar Mitzvah Boy (1976), The Other Woman (1976), Abigail's Party (1977), Blue Remembered Hills (1979) and Just a Boys' Game (1979). Certain other plays, including Penda's Fen (1974) and Nuts in May (1976), were commissioned by David Rose of the BBC's English Regions Drama department based in Pebble Mill Studios in Birmingham.

Some installments in the series were spun off into full-blown series, including Rumpole of the Bailey, which was produced as a one-off in the Play for Today strand in 1975 and three years later became a series for Thames Television, again with Leo McKern. Alan Bleasdale's The Black Stuff, was a single play broadcast on BBC2 in January 1980, which was developed into Boys from the Blackstuff. It was never part of the Play For Today strand, although it was repeated on BBC1 later that year as a single play.

Other offshoots were Gangsters, Headmaster, and a single series of science fiction-based plays styled as Play for Tomorrow. Towards the end of the run, three plays set in Northern Ireland were written by Graham Reid. Known as the Billy Plays, they starred Kenneth Branagh as Billy Martin in his first acting role following his graduation from RADA.

There were also some groups of plays transmitted that — for various reasons — did not go out under the Play for Today banner, but which were funded from the same department, used much the same production team and are generally regarded in episode guides and analysis as being part of the Play for Today canon.

Several plays were BAFTA award winners. John Le Mesurier and Patricia Hayes were named Best Actor and Actress, respectively, for their roles in the 1971 series Traitor and Edna, The Inebriate Woman, the latter also being named Best Drama Production. Dame Celia Johnson was named Best Actress for Mrs. Palfrey At The Claremont, broadcast in 1973. Stocker's Copper (1972), Kisses At Fifty (1973), Bar Mitzvah Boy (1976), Spend, Spend, Spend! (1977), Licking Hitler (1978) and Blue Remembered Hills (1979) were all named Best Single Play by BAFTA.

Videotapes of thirty-seven of the episodes produced between 1970 and 75 were wiped after transmission, and no copies of many of them are known to exist.

Controversies

Two plays were controversially pulled from transmission shortly before broadcast due to concerns over their content: these were Dennis Potter's Brimstone & Treacle in 1976 and Roy Minton's Scum the following year. In the case of Brimstone & Treacle it was due to concerns over the play's depiction of a disabled woman's rape at the hands of a man who may possibly have been the devil, and with Scum the worry was its supposed sensationalism of life in a borstal. Scum and Brimstone & Treacle were eventually transmitted, although in the meantime both had circumvented their withdrawal by being re-made as cinema films.

One play, The Other Woman, generated some mild controversy for its "graphic depiction" of lesbianism, and for the onscreen kiss between Jane Lapotaire and Lynne Frederick.

Demise and legacy

After fourteen seasons and numerous repeats of individual productions, the programme officially ended in August 1984, although two seasons of single dramas without Play for Today billing were broadcast on BBC1 in a similar time slot from July to December 1983 and from November 1984 to February 1985. Thereafter the strand of single dramas became Screen Two on BBC2 from January 1985, and later also Screen One on BBC1 from September 1989. The general trend in 1980s television production was away from one-off plays and towards a greater concentration on series and serials. When one-offs were produced, such as Film on Four on Channel 4, they tended to be made with a cinematic approach rather than betraying television drama's roots in the theatre that Play for Today and earlier series on both the BBC and  ITV had often demonstrated.

Nonetheless, the series is generally remembered as a benchmark of high-quality British television drama, and has become a byword for what many continue to argue was a golden age of British television. In 2000, the British Film Institute produced a poll of industry professionals to determine the 100 Greatest British Television Programmes of the 20th century, and five of the programmes included in the final tally were from Play for Today.

A new programme publicised as a return of Play for Today, but under the working title of The Evening Play, was announced at the beginning of March 2006, but nothing has been heard from it since. Kevin Spacey, film star and director of the Old Vic, in March 2008 told BBC News that he would like to see the return of the show,
but the journalists Michael Gove and Mark Lawson expressed disagreement, Gove (by then a Conservative MP) describing them, at best counter-intuitively, as "exercises in viewer patronisation". Jan Moir in The Daily Telegraph wrote in support of Spacey, saying "the British loved Play for Today once, and would do so again. A good piece of drama looks at the human condition, and tells us something we should know about ourselves."

A book detailing the origins of the series, Play for Today: The First Year, by Simon Farquhar, was published in 2021.

Productions
Sourced according to the BBC Genome archive of Radio Times magazines. Titles that carried the tag Play For Today on the BBC listings for their first or subsequent transmission are included, along with some repeats such as the repeat of the Days of Hope quartet, where the initial broadcast was not branded Play for Today, but the repeat was. Repeats of the individual productions are excluded. All episodes were broadcast on BBC1, except for the delayed broadcast of Scum in 1991 which was broadcast on BBC2.

Some early episodes are missing or no longer exist in colour.

Home media
The BFI have released three box sets of the series on Blu-ray, each consisting of various plays from throughout the show's run. Volume 1 contains seven plays broadcast between 1970 and 77; The Lie (1970), Shakespeare or Bust (1973), Back of Beyond (1974), Passage to England (1975), Your Man from Six Counties (1976), Our Flesh and Blood (1977), and A Photograph (1977). Five of the productions were remastered using the original 16mm film negatives which still exist in the BBC Archives.

Volume 2 contains six plays broadcast between 1972 and 79; Stocker's Copper (1972), The Elephants' Graveyard (1976), Gotcha / Campion's Interview (1977), The Spongers (1978), Victims of Apartheid (1978), and Just a Boy's Game (1979).

Volume 3, released on 21 March 2022, contains six plays broadcast between 1971 and 79; Edna, the Inebriate Woman (1971), Just Another Saturday (1975), Bar Mitzvah Boy (1976), The Mayor's Charity (1977), Coming Out (1979), and A Hole in Babylon (1979).

Robin Redbreast, Penda's Fen, Abigail's Party, Our Day Out, The Imitation Game and several others have received standalone releases on DVD and Blu-ray, whilst others have been released on compilation DVDs with the creators' other works.

References

Bibliography
Evans, Jeff. The Penguin TV Companion (1st ed.). London: Penguin Books. 2001. .

Vahimagi, Tise. British Television: An Illustrated Guide. Oxford. Oxford University Press / British Film Institute. 1994. .
Farquhar, Simon. Play for Today: The First Year. 2021. .

External links

 Drama out of a Crisis: A Celebration of Play for Today - 2020 BBC documentary

TV Cream's Play for Today website, contains synopses of most episodes Internet archive link
Play for Today pages on British Television Drama site
Play for Today section at the BFI's Screenonline
Archive status of Play for Today at lostshows.com Redirects to TVBrain | Kaleidoscope | Lost shows | TV Archive | TV History, a paysite

 
1970s British drama television series
1980s British drama television series
1970 British television series debuts
1984 British television series endings
BBC television dramas
1970s British anthology television series
1980s British anthology television series
Social realism
English-language television shows